Pandoke may refer to:

 Pandoke, Lahore, a village in Punjab, Pakistan
 Pandoke, Gujranwala, a village in Punjab, Pakistan.